Lawrence James "Larry" DeLucas  (O. D., Ph.D.) is an American biochemist who flew aboard NASA  Space Shuttle mission STS-50 as a Payload Specialist.  He was born on July 11, 1950 in Syracuse, New York, and is currently married with three children.  His recreational interests include basketball, scuba diving, bowling, model airplanes, astronomy and reading.

Education
DeLucas attended the University of Alabama at Birmingham (UAB), in Birmingham, Alabama and received the following degrees:
Bachelor of Science degree in Chemistry (1972)
Master of Science degree in Chemistry (1974)
Bachelor of Science degree in Physiological Optics (1979)
Doctorate in Optometry (1981)
Doctorate in Biochemistry (1981)

Organizations
DeLucas has served as a member of the following organizations:
American Crystallographic Association
American Academy of Optometry
American Institute of Aeronautics and Astronautics
Alabama Optometric Association
American Association of Pharmaceutical Scientists
National Aeronautic Association
Biotechnology Industry Organization
Biotechnology Association of Alabama
Helen Keller Eye Research Foundation
American Academy of Inventors

Publications
He has published 163 research articles in refereed scientific journals, is co-author of 2 books, and co-inventor on 43 patents.

Honors
 Co-Chair, Spacehab Science Advisory Board
 Secretary of the Board, Council of Biotechnology Centers, Biotechnology Industry Council
 Distinguished Faculty Lecturer, UAB
 NASA Research Award for research hardware patent entitled "Protein Crystal Growth Vapor Diffusion Apparatus for Microgravity " (September 1988)
 Howell Heflin Statesmanship Award for Technology, NASA Space Flight Medal
 Recognized as one of the scientists who could shape the 21st century in an article by The Sunday Times entitled "The Brains Behind the 21st Century"
 Distinguished Crystallography Lecturer for Pittsburgh Diffraction Society Lecturers
 Honorary Doctor of Science degree, Illinois College of Optometry (May 1998)
 Honorary Doctor of Science degree, State University of New York College of Optometry (May 1997)
 Honorary Doctor of Science degree, Ferris State University, Big Rapids, MI (May 2002)
 Honorary Doctor of Science degree, The Ohio State University, Illinois College of Optometry, State University of New York State College of Optometry, and Ferris State University, Big Rapids, MI.
 NASA Space Flight Medal; flew as a payload specialist astronaut on the Columbia Space Shuttle, June 25-July 9, 1992. This was the longest space shuttle flight to date making 221 orbits of Earth.  
 Served as the NASA Chief Scientist for the International Space Station, at NASA HQ in Washington DC; 1994–1995.
 National Aeronautics and Space Administration Group Achievement Award for “Microgravity Experiments Design, Development and Operations Team” (February 1993)
 Distinguished Crystallography Lecturer for Pittsburgh Diffraction Society Lectures, Pittsburgh, Pennsylvania (October 1993)
 Received the 1st Distinguished Alumnus Award from the University of Alabama at Birmingham, December 8, 1991.
 Recipient of the “Order of Rio Branco Award, Rank of Commander” from the Brazilian Government on behalf of the President of Brazil.  The Order of Rio Branco is awarded to recognize and celebrate the merits of Brazilian and foreign individuals who have significantly contributed to the promotion of Brazil’s relation with the world. This award was presented to Dr. DeLucas at the Brazilian Embassy in Washington, D.C. by the Brazilian Ambassador to the United States. The award was the result of several of Dr. DeLucas’ activities in Brazil. Dr. DeLucas devoted a significant amount of time in impoverished regions of Brazil, giving inspirational talks to students in elementary schools and high schools and to the general public.
 Inducted into the National Optometry Hall of Fame (October 2002)
 Honorary Alumnus, Department of Natural Sciences and Mathematics (Awarded January 28, 2010)
 President’s Award for Excellence in Teaching, awarded at the Faculty Awards Ceremony (February 2011)
 NASA Public Service Medal for exemplary performance in support of the Microgravity Projects Office (June 1997)
 "Optometrist of the Year" by the Southeastern Optometric Association (February 1992)
 First Annual UAB "Distinguished Alumnus Award" (December 1991)

Experience
 1975 – 1976: Research Associate in the Institute of Dental Research, UAB
 1977 – 1982: Graduate Student, working on combined doctoral degrees in Optometry and Biochemistry
 1982 – 2016: Member of Vision Science Research Center
 1983 – 2016: Member, Graduate Faculty, UAB
 1984 – 2016: Scientist, Comprehensive Cancer Center, UAB
 1986 – 1992: Associate Director, Center for Macromolecular Crystallography, UAB
 1987 – 2001: Member of NASA Science Advisory Committee for Advanced Protein Crystal Growth
 1989 – 2016: Adjunct Professor, Materials Science, University of Alabama in Huntsville, University of Alabama at Birmingham, University of Alabama
 1989 – 2016: Professor, Department of Optometry, UAB
 1990 – 2016: Adjunct Professor, Laboratory of Medical Genetics, UAB
 1990 – 2016: Adjunct Professor, Department of Biochemistry, UAB
 1990 – 2010: Member, Executive Committee and Board of the Helen Keller Eye Research Foundation
 1994 – 1995: NASA Chief Scientist for International Space Station
 1994 – 2016: Director, Center for Biophysical Sciences and Engineering, UAB
 1994 – 2016: Director, Cancer Center X-ray Core Facility, UAB
 1996 – 2016: Member Research Foundation and Technology Transfer Committee, UAB
 1997 – 1998: Member Metabolic Bone Disease, UAB
 1997 – 2000: Member, Media Relations Group, UAB
 2001 – 2016: Adjunct Professor, Physiology and Biophysics
 2016–present: Principal Scientist, The Aerospace Corporation
 2021-present, President and Founder, Soluble Biotech Inc.

Spaceflight

DeLucas was a member of the crew of Space Shuttle Columbia for STS-50 (June 25-July 9, 1992), the United States Microgravity Laboratory-1 (USML-1) Spacelab mission. Over a two-week period, the crew conducted a wide variety of experiments relating to materials processing and fluid physics. At mission conclusion, DeLucas had traveled over 5.7 million miles in 221 Earth orbits, and had logged over 331 hours in space.

External links
 
Spacefacts biography of Lawrence J. DeLucas

1950 births
Living people
People from Birmingham, Alabama
University of Alabama at Birmingham alumni
University of Alabama in Huntsville faculty
People from Syracuse, New York
NASA civilian astronauts
Space Shuttle program astronauts